The Big East Conference men's soccer tournament is the conference championship tournament in soccer for the Big East Conference. The single-elimination tournament has been held every year since the Big East Conference realignment in 2013. Seeding for the tournament is based on regular season conference records, with the first and second seed teams receiving a bye to the semifinals round. The winner, declared conference champion, receives the conference's automatic bid to the NCAA Division I men's soccer championship.

With five titles, Georgetown has the most Big East tournament titles in the current iteration of the Big East Conference.

Champions

Sources:

By year

By school

References

External links